Leiolopisma ceciliae, also known as the Réunion giant skink, was a species of skink found on Réunion. The species is classified as extinct.

References

Leiolopisma
Reptiles described in 2008
Taxa named by Edwin Nicholas Arnold
Taxa named by Roger Bour